College Street Historic District is a national historic district located at Clinton, Sampson County, North Carolina.  The district encompasses 22 contributing buildings in a predominantly residential section of Clinton.  It developed between about 1840 to the 1930s, and includes notable examples of Greek Revival, Colonial Revival, and Classical Revival architecture.  Located in the district is the separately listed Graves-Stewart House.  Other notable buildings include the Colonel John Ashford House (c. 1839, 1869), College Street Elementary School (1911), John R. Beaman House (1850s), Hobbs-Matthews-Small House (remodeled 1926), Dr. Fleet Rose Cooper House (1890s), Jim McArthur House (1905-1910), Kate Powell House (c. 1900), Henry L. Stewart House (1926), Dr. R. A. Turlington House (c. 1928), Carroll-Morris House (c. 1920), and Turlington Rental House (1929).

It was added to the National Register of Historic Places in 1986.

References

Historic districts on the National Register of Historic Places in North Carolina
Colonial Revival architecture in North Carolina
Greek Revival architecture in North Carolina
Neoclassical architecture in North Carolina
Buildings and structures in Sampson County, North Carolina
National Register of Historic Places in Sampson County, North Carolina